Nur (Bashkir and ) is a rural locality (a village) in Kandrinsky Selsoviet, Tuymazinsky District, Bashkortostan, Russia. The population was 31 as of 2010. There is 1 street.

Geography 
Nur is located 18 km southeast of Tuymazy (the district's administrative centre) by road.

References 

Rural localities in Tuymazinsky District